Jules Buyssens (1872-1958) was a noted Belgian landscape architect. He served as head of the Brussels parks department, and was gardener-in-chief for the 1935 Belgian centennial exposition.

Selected gardens 
 Léonardsau Park, Obernai, France
 Picturesque Garden, Museum van Buuren, Brussels, Belgium
 Parc Arboretum du Manoir Aux Loups, Halluin, France

References 
 Marc Treib, The Architecture of Landscape, 1940-1960, University of Pennsylvania Press, 2002, page 115. .

Belgian landscape architects
1958 deaths
1872 births